In chemistry, isotopologues are molecules that differ only in their isotopic composition. They have the same chemical formula and bonding arrangement of atoms, but at least one atom has a different number of neutrons than the parent.

Oxygen-related isotopologues of water include the commonly available form of heavy-oxygen water and the more difficult to separate version with the  isotope. Both elements may be replaced by isotopes, for example in the doubly labeled water isotopologue . All taken together, there are 9 different stable water isotopologues, and 9 radioactive isotopologues involving tritium, for a total of 18. However only certain ratios are possible in mixture, due to prevalent hydrogen swapping. 

The atom(s) of the different isotope may be anywhere in a molecule, so the difference is in the net chemical formula. If a compound has several atoms of the same element, any one of them could be the altered one, and it would still be the same isotopologue. When considering the different locations of the same isotopically modified element, the term isotopomer, first proposed by Seeman and Paine in 1992, is used.
Isotopomerism is analogous to constitutional isomerism of different elements in a structure. Depending on the formula and the symmetry of the structure, there might be several isotopomers of one isotopologue. For example, ethanol has the molecular formula . Mono-deuterated ethanol, is an isotopologue of it.

Singly substituted isotopologues

Analytical chemistry applications
Singly substituted isotopologues may be used for nuclear magnetic resonance experiments, where deuterated solvents such as deuterated chloroform (CDCl3) do not interfere with the solutes' 1H signals, and in investigations of the kinetic isotope effect.

Geochemical applications

In the field of stable isotope geochemistry, isotopologues of simple molecules containing rare heavy isotopes of carbon, oxygen, hydrogen, nitrogen, and sulfur are used to trace equilibrium and kinetic processes in natural environments and in Earth's past.

Doubly substituted isotopologues

Measurement of the abundance of clumped isotopes (doubly substituted isotopologues) of gases has been used in the field of stable isotope geochemistry to trace equilibrium and kinetic processes in the environment inaccessible by analysis of singly substituted isotopologues alone.

Currently measured doubly substituted isotopologues include:
Carbon dioxide: 13C18O16O
Methane: 13CH3D and 12CH2D2
Oxygen: 18O2 and 17O18O
Nitrogen: 15N2
Nitrous oxide: 14N15N18O and 15N14N18O

Analytical requirements
Because of the relative rarity of the heavy isotopes of C, H, and O, isotope-ratio mass spectrometry (IRMS) of doubly substituted species requires larger volumes of sample gas and longer analysis times than traditional stable isotope measurements, thereby requiring extremely stable instrumentation. In addition, the doubly-substituted isotopologues are often subject to isobaric interferences, as in the methane system where 13CH5+ and 12CH3D+ ions interfere with measurement of the 12CH2D2+ and 13CH3D+ species at mass 18. A measurement of such species requires either very high mass resolving power to separate one isobar from another, or modeling of the contributions of the interfering species to the abundance of the species of interest. These analytical challenges are significant: The first publication precisely measuring doubly substituted isotopologues did not appear until 2004, though singly substituted isotopologues had been measured for decades previously.

As an alternative to more conventional gas source IRMS instruments, tunable diode laser absorption spectroscopy has also emerged as a method to measure doubly substituted species free from isobaric interferences, and has been applied to the methane isotopologue 13CH3D.

Equilibrium fractionation
When a light isotope is replaced with a heavy isotope (e.g., 13C for 12C), the bond between the two atoms will vibrate more slowly, thereby lowering the zero-point energy of the bond and acting to stabilize the molecule. An isotopologue with a doubly substituted bond is therefore slightly more thermodynamically stable, which will tend to produce a higher abundance of the doubly substituted (or “clumped”) species than predicted by the statistical abundance of each heavy isotope (known as a stochastic distribution of isotopes). This effect increases in magnitude with decreasing temperature, so the abundance of the clumped species is related to the temperature at which the gas was formed or equilibrated. By measuring the abundance of the clumped species in standard gases formed in equilibrium at known temperatures, the thermometer can be calibrated and applied to samples with unknown abundances.

Kinetic fractionation
The abundances of multiply substituted isotopologues can also be affected by kinetic processes. As for singly substituted isotopologues, departures from thermodynamic equilibrium in a doubly-substituted species can implicate the presence of a particular reaction taking place. Photochemistry occurring in the atmosphere has been shown to alter the abundance of 18O2 from equilibrium, as has photosynthesis. Measurements of 13CH3D and 12CH2D2 can identify microbial processing of methane and have been used to demonstrate the significance of quantum tunneling in the formation of methane, as well as mixing and equilibration of multiple methane reservoirs. Variations in the relative abundances of the two N2O isotopologues 14N15N18O and 15N14N18O can distinguish whether N2O has been produced by bacterial denitrification or by bacterial nitrification.

Multiple substituted isotopologues

Biochemical applications
Multiple substituted isotopologues may be used for nuclear magnetic resonance or mass spectrometry experiments, where isotopologues are used to elucidate metabolic pathways in a qualitative (detect new pathways) or quantitative (detect quantitative share of a pathway) approach. A popular example in biochemistry is the use of uniform labelled glucose (U-13C glucose), which is metabolized by the organism under investigation (e. g. bacterium, plant, or animal) and whose signatures can later be detected in newly formed amino acid or metabolically cycled products.

Mass spectrometry applications 
Resulting from either naturally occurring isotopes or artificial isotopic labeling, isotopologues can be used in various mass spectrometry applications.

Applications of natural isotopologues

The relative mass spectral intensity of natural isotopologues, calculable from the fractional abundances of the constituent elements, is exploited by mass spectrometry practitioners in quantitative analysis and unknown compound identification:

 To identify the more likely molecular formulas for an unknown compound based on the matching between the observed isotope abundance pattern in an experiment and the expected isotope abundance patterns for given molecular formulas.
 To expand the linear dynamic response range of the mass spectrometer by following multiple isotopologues, with an isotopologue of lower abundance still generating linear response even while the isotopologues of higher abundance giving saturated signals.

Applications of isotope labeling

A compound tagged by replacing specific atoms with the corresponding isotopes can facilitate the following mass spectrometry methods:

 Metabolic flux analysis (MFA)
 Stable isotopically labeled internal standards for quantitative analysis

See also
Mass (mass spectrometry)
Isotope-ratio mass spectrometry
Isotopomer
Clumped isotopes

Isotopocule

References

External links
Fractional abundance of atmospheric isotopologues, SpectralCalc.com

Isotopes